The 1909 Norwegian Football Cup was the eighth season of the Norwegian annual knockout football tournament. The tournament was open for 1909 local association leagues (kretsserier) champions, except in Smaalene and Kristiania og omegn where a separate cup qualifying tournament was held. Lyn won their second consecutive title.

First round

|colspan="3" style="background-color:#97DEFF"|18 September 1909

|}

Lyn and Trondhjems Teknikere received a bye.

Semi-finals

|colspan="3" style="background-color:#97DEFF"|25 September 1909

|}

Final

References

External links
RSSSF Football Archive

Norwegian Football Cup seasons
Norway
Football Cup